Laura Leiner (born 22 April 1985) is a Hungarian writer who made her publishing debut in 2005. Her most notable work is the series A Szent Johanna gimi (Joan of Arc High School), that she later clarified is fictitious and not based on her own life.

The first part of Szent Johanna Gimi was released at the Book Festival of Hungary in 2010. Two parts of the series were on the list of Libri's Gold Books in 2011 and one in 2010 She was the number one writer in Bookline's list of March 2012.

Her books are written from the point of view of her readers' age group. The series has a cult following in Hungary.

Bibliography

Awards
A Szent Johanna gimi 1 – Kezdet Libri Aranykönyv 2010 – 7th place
A Szent Johanna gimi 4 – Barátok Libri Aranykönyv 2011 – 5th place
A Szent Johanna gimi 5 – Remény Libri Aranykönyv 2011 – 4th place

References

External links
Official  home page of Laura Leiner 

Current Publishing House Exkluzív: Interview 22 March 2011 Media-addict.hu
 A vásárlások száma szerint 3., 21., 28., 29., 42., 44., 48. helyezést ért el Leiner Laura a könyveivel egyidejűleg.

1985 births
Living people
20th-century Hungarian writers
20th-century Hungarian women writers